The following is a list of Trans-AMA Champions, from 1970 to 1978. The championship was an international series established by the American Motorcyclist Association as a pilot event to help establish motocross in the United States. The series was based on a 500cc engine displacement formula, although the first year of the event featured both 250 and 500cc events. The races run on American tracks to international standards, featuring the top riders from the F.I.M. world championship against the top American riders. In 1970 and 1971, the highest placing American rider at the end of the series was considered the A.M.A. national champion. 

By 1978, American riders had improved to the point where it became more of a challenge for European riders to secure an easy victory. Since riders were paid based upon their results rather than starting money paid in European races, fewer European riders were motivated to make the costly trans-atlantic voyage. After 1978 the series was renamed the Trans-USA series, but had fewer European riders participating. The Inter-AMA series was a similar year-end championship, but used a 250cc engine displacement formula.

Trans-AMA champions

Trans-USA champions

Inter-AMA champions

See also 
 List of AMA motocross national champions
 Supercross World Championship
 Motocross World Championship

References
Motocross Action

Motorcycle off-road racing series
Trans-AMA